Oru Raagam Pala Thaalam is a 1979 Indian Malayalam-language film,  directed by M. Krishnan Nair and produced by Srividya and George Thomas. The film stars Madhu, Jayan, Srividya and Jagathy Sreekumar. The film has musical score by M. S. Viswanathan. The film was a remake of Aalayamani.

Cast

Madhu
Jayan
Srividya
Jagathy Sreekumar
Sankaradi
Aranmula Ponnamma
Balan K. Nair
P. K. Abraham
Reena
T. P. Madhavan
Vazhoor Rajan

Soundtrack
The music was composed by M. S. Viswanathan with lyrics by Sreekumaran Thampi.

References

External links
 

1979 films
1970s Malayalam-language films
Films scored by M. S. Viswanathan
Malayalam remakes of Tamil films
Films directed by M. Krishnan Nair